The following highways are numbered 113:

Canada
 British Columbia Highway 113
 New Brunswick Route 113
 Nova Scotia Highway 113
 Prince Edward Island Route 113                                   
 Quebec Route 113

Costa Rica
 National Route 113

India
 National Highway 113 (India)

Japan
 Route 113 (Japan)

Philippines
 N113 highway (Philippines)

United States
 U.S. Route 113
 Alabama State Route 113
 Arkansas Highway 113
 California State Route 113
 Colorado State Highway 113
 Connecticut Route 113
 Florida State Road 113
  Georgia State Route 113
 Illinois Route 113
 Indiana State Road 113
 Iowa Highway 113
 K-113 (Kansas highway)
 Kentucky Route 113
 Louisiana Highway 113
 Maine State Route 113
 Massachusetts Route 113
 M-113 (Michigan highway)
 Minnesota State Highway 113
 Missouri Route 113
 Nebraska Highway 113 (former)
 New Hampshire Route 113
 New Hampshire Route 113A
 New Hampshire Route 113B
 New Mexico State Road 113
 New York State Route 113
 County Route 113 (Erie County, New York)
 County Route 113 (Fulton County, New York)
 County Route 113 (Herkimer County, New York)
 County Route 113 (Steuben County, New York)
 County Route 113 (Suffolk County, New York)
 County Route 113 (Sullivan County, New York)
 County Route 113 (Tompkins County, New York)
 County Route 113A (Tompkins County, New York)
 County Route 113 (Washington County, New York)
 North Carolina Highway 113
 Ohio State Route 113
 Oklahoma State Highway 113
 Pennsylvania Route 113
 Rhode Island Route 113
 South Carolina Highway 113
 Tennessee State Route 113
 Texas State Highway 113
 Texas State Highway Loop 113 (former)
 Texas State Highway Spur 113
 Texas State Highway Spur 113 (1940–1948) (former)
 Farm to Market Road 113
 Utah State Route 113
 Vermont Route 113
 Virginia State Route 113
 Virginia State Route 113 (1923-1928) (former)
 Virginia State Route 113 (1928-1933) (former)
 Virginia State Route 113 (1933-1942) (former)
 Washington State Route 113
 Wisconsin Highway 113
 Wyoming Highway 113

Territories
 Puerto Rico Highway 113

See also
A113 road
D113 road
N-113 road (Spain)
P113
R113 road (Ireland)
S113 (Amsterdam)